Mordechai Navi Synagogue ( (Mordechai Navi sinagog)), is a Jewish synagogue in the Armenian capital Yerevan, and the centre of the Jewish community of the city. It is located on 23 Nar-Dos Street of the central Kentron district. It was opened in June 2011, with the financial assistance of the Armenian businessman David Galstyan.

The Mordechai Navi Synagogue is the only Jewish place of worship in Armenia. It is headed by the Chief Rabbi of Armenia Gershon Burstein.

The Jewish community in Armenia has a history of 2,000 years, when first Jewish groups settled in Armenia after the destruction of Solomon's Temple in Jerusalem. However, currently the Jewish population in Armenia is around 100 only. Rima Varzhapetyan-Feller is the head of the Jewish community in Armenia since 1996.

References

Synagogues in Armenia
Buildings and structures in Yerevan